See Arnold Run is a 2005 American biographical film starring Jürgen Prochnow and Roland Kickinger, both playing Arnold Schwarzenegger at different ages. The film covers Arnold's early years in bodybuilding and his successful run for Governor of California.

Cast

 Jürgen Prochnow as Arnold Schwarzenegger
 Roland Kickinger as Arnold Schwarzenegger ('73). Kickinger would later appear in the 2009 film Terminator Salvation as the body double of T-800, with Schwarzenegger's face digitally superimposed over his own.
 Nora Dunn as Arianna Huffington
 Craig Zimmerman as George Butler ('73)
 Mariel Hemingway as Maria Shriver
 Kristen Shaw as Barbara Walters
 Michael Ergas as Franco Columbu
 Nick Stellate as Frank Zane
 David Lloyd Wilson as Gustav Schwarzenegger
 Frank Zane as IFBB Announcer
 Robert Michael Cicherillo as Lou Ferrigno
 Leonard Stone as Warren Buffett

Reception

The film received generally negative reviews, receiving a rating of 24% on Rotten Tomatoes.

References

External links

2005 television films
2005 films
2005 biographical drama films
American biographical drama films
Biographical films about politicians
Films directed by J. B. Rogers
Films scored by Lee Holdridge
Films set in the 1970s
Films set in 2003
Cultural depictions of Arnold Schwarzenegger
Bodybuilding films
American drama television films
2000s English-language films
2000s American films